Research networking (RN) is about using tools to identify, locate and use research and scholarly information about people and resources. Research networking tools (RN tools) serve as knowledge management systems for the research enterprise. RN tools connect institution-level/enterprise systems, national research networks, publicly available research data (e.g., grants and publications), and restricted/proprietary data by harvesting information from disparate sources into compiled profiles for faculty, investigators, scholars, clinicians, community partners and facilities. RN tools facilitate collaboration and team science to address research challenges through the rapid discovery and recommendation of researchers, expertise and resources.

RN tools differ from search engines like Google in that RN tools access information in databases and other data not limited to web pages. They also differ from social networking systems in that they represent a compendium of data ingested from authoritative and verifiable sources rather than predominantly individually-posted information, making RN tools more reliable.  Yet, RN tools have sufficient flexibility to allow for profile editing.  RN tools provide resources to bolster human connections: they can make non-intuitive matches, do not depend on serendipity and do not have a propensity to return only to previously identified collaborations/collaborators.  RN tools generally have associated analytical capabilities that enable evaluation of collaboration and cross-disciplinary research/scholarly activity, especially over time.

RN tools and research profiling systems can help researchers gain recognition. Active promotion of scholarship is an aspect of the publication cycle. Commercial and non-profit services help researchers increase visibility and recognition. Digital researcher services enhance discoverability, shareability and citability of scholarship. According to Shanks and Arlitsch, digital researcher services fall into three categories:
 Author/Researcher Identification—these services provide infrastructure that may be used in the other two categories, such as unique identifiers and name disambiguation.
 Academic and Professional Networking—most succinctly described as “social networking for academics,” these services focus on connecting users based on research interest, affiliation, geography or other variables.
 Reference and Citation Management—these tools and services include some of the functionality and features of other categories, although their primary focus is on management of citations that a researcher compiles for use within a publication or for sharing with other researchers.

Importantly, data harvested into RN tools can be repurposed, especially if available as Linked Open Data (RDF triples). These RN tools enhance research support activities by providing data for customized, web pages, CV/biosketch generation and data tables for grant proposals.

General

Data sources, ingest and export formats 

This table provides information on the types of data used in each RN tool and how this data is ingested, along with data export formats (e.g. XML, RDF, RIS, PDF)

Data interoperability and integration 

Whether a research networking tool is compatible with institutional enterprise systems (e.g. human resources databases), can be integrated with other external products or add-ons and can be used for regional, national, international or federated connectivity.

Users profiled, user interactivity and networking functionality 

This table provides information on what user population is profiled for each tool, ability for users to edit their own profile data and type of networking.  Active networking means that the user can enter connections to the network by entering colleagues' names.  Passive networking means that the software infers network connections from a user's publication co-authors and builds a network from these names.

Controlled vocabulary, ontologies and author disambiguation 

This table provides information on the types of controlled vocabulary or thesauri used by the tools, as well as ontologies supported and whether author disambiguation is performed by the software.

Bibliometrics 

This table provides information on the types of bibliometrics provided in the tool.

See also

 Current research information system
 Social networking service

Notes and references

Bibliography

 
 
 Cressman, D., Holbrook, J.A., Lewis, B.S., and Wixted, B. (2011). Understanding the Structure of Formal Research Networks (Vancouver, BC: Simon Fraser University).
 
 Falk-Krzesinski H, Shaw PL and Wimbiscus-Yoon L (2010). "Comparative Matrix of Research Networking Tools". (Poster presentation). National VIVO Conference: Enabling National Networking of Scientists (Queens, NY).
 
 
 
 
 
 
 
 
 Spallek H, Schleyer T and Butler BS (2008). "Good partners are hard to find: the search for and selection of collaborators in the health sciences". Paper presented at: Fourth IEEE International Conference on eScience (Indianapolis, IN: IEEE Computer Society).
 Stewart D (2011). "Enterprise content management in three easy questions". In Gartner Blog Network (Stamford, CT: Gartner).
 Stewart DL (2010). "Knowing what you know: Expertise Discovery & management - Part 1". In Connected Knowledge, DL Stewart, ed. (Portland, OR Oregon Health & Science University).
 Stewart DL (2010). "Sustaining the collaborative enterprise". In Connected Knowledge, DL Stewart, ed. (Portland, OR Oregon Health & Science University).
 Wieder B (2011). "Academic-reference firm offers $10,001 for best new research tool". In The Wired Campus, L Schamber, ed. (Washington, DC: The Chronicle of Higher Education).

External links
This page has been cited by "AAMC Technology Now Research Networking" (pdf).

Research Networking Tools and Research Profiling Systems
Bibliographic databases and indexes
Bibliometrics software
Research management